Mary Dawne Arden (July 30, 1933 – December 13, 2014) was an American actress who worked in both Hollywood and Italy.

Early years 
Arden was born in St. Louis, Missouri, but moved to New York City at the age of 12 to attend an art school.

Career 
Arden had a successful modeling career in Europe and appeared in numerous Italian movies during the 1960s. This actress is not to be confused with Mary Arden, who worked in Hollywood in the 1930s and 1940s, but worked professionally as Mary Arden.

Mary Arden's best known role is that of model Peggy Peyton in Mario Bava's Blood and Black Lace. Aside from acting in the film, Arden was also responsible for writing its English dialogue, as she seemed the original translated screenplay to be too stilted. She also made an uncredited cameo appearance in Juliet of the Spirits as an on-screen TV personality. In the 1960s, she also worked in the United States as a member of the June Taylor Dancers, on the televised Jackie Gleason show.

While in Italy, she also appeared in photo novels including a well-known series of the period, entitled Kriminal. After living and working in Italy for eight years, she returned to the United States in 1979, and performed in only a couple of  more roles, before retiring completely from the cinema.

She spent nine years in Latin America where she held marketing and managing positions for Helena Rubinstein Cosmetics. When she returned to NYC, she began her own marketing and body language consulting practice, Arden Associates.

Arden was also on the faculty of New York University, in the Department of Culture and Communication, where she taught business communication.

Personal life
Arden married A.A. Hansi in Rome in 1965.

Death 
Arden died in Calvary Hospital in Brooklyn, New York, on December 13, 2014 at the age of 81.

Filmography

References

 Biography at gosadistik.com

External links
 

1933 births
2014 deaths
American expatriates in Italy
American film actresses
20th-century American actresses
Female models from Missouri
Actresses from St. Louis
21st-century American women